Clifford Bryson Fannin (May 13, 1924 – December 11, 1966) was an American professional baseball pitcher who appeared in Major League Baseball from –. The right-hander played his entire career for the St. Louis Browns.

In 164 Major League games pitched, 98 as a starting pitcher, Fannin compiled a win–loss mark of 34–51, with an earned run average of 4.85 and 352 strikeouts. He logged six shutouts and 28 complete games, and earned six saves. Fannin's best season was probably , when he went 10–14, with ten complete games, and 102 strikeouts, the only season he struck out more than 100. Over his MLB career, Fannin allowed 763 hits and 393 bases on balls in 733 innings.

He died at age 42 in Sandusky, Ohio, of a coronary occlusion.

References

External links

1924 births
1966 deaths
Baseball players from Kentucky
Elmira Pioneers players
Huntington Jewels players
Major League Baseball pitchers
Native American sportspeople
People from Louisa, Kentucky
St. Louis Browns players
San Antonio Missions players
San Diego Padres (minor league) players
Toledo Mud Hens players
Toronto Maple Leafs (International League) players